Géminis is a 2005 Argentine-French drama film written and directed by Albertina Carri. It is set in a rich family where two adolescent children have started an incestuous relationship.

Synopsis
Meme and her brother Jere are teenagers, still at home under a passive father, Daniel, and a massively domineering mother, Lucía. Ezequiel, the eldest child, arrives from Spain with his bride Montse, who finds both the family and the society of upper-middle-class Argentina hollow and pretentious. Gradually, the other characters learn that Meme and Jere, neither of whom has developed satisfactory outside links, have started an incestuous sexual relationship.

Cast 
 Cristina Banegas as Lucía
 Daniel Fanego as Daniel
 María Abadi as Meme
 Lucas Escáriz as Jeremías
 Damián Ramonda as Ezequiel
 Silvia Baylé as Olga
 Julieta Zylberberg as Montse
 Lucrecia Capello as Nené
 Carlos Durañona as Jorge
 Beatriz Spelzini as Inés
 Gogó Andreu as Lucio
 Vivi Tellas as Ana

External links 
 
 Ficha técnica cinenacional.com 
 Adentro, muy adentro Entrevista a Albertina Carri, pagina12.com.ar, 9 de junio de 2005 
 "El arte tiene que provocar" Entrevista a Albertina Carri, clarin.com, 9 de junio de 2005 

2005 films
Films about twins
Argentine drama films
2000s Spanish-language films
Films shot in Argentina
Incest in film
Juvenile sexuality in films
2000s Argentine films